The NCAA Division III Men's Golf Championships is the annual golf tournament, typically played in mid-May, to determine the team and individual national champions of men's collegiate golf in the United States. It has been played annually since 1975, when it split-away from the NCAA College Division Men's Golf Championships when the NCAA split into its current three-division structure.

It is a stroke play team competition, but there is also an award for the lowest scoring individual competitor.

Methodist is the most successful program, with 13 national titles.

Methodist is also the reigning national champions.

Results

† One of the four scheduled rounds was cancelled
P Individual championship determined by playoff

Multiple winners

Team
The following schools have won more than one team championship:
13: Methodist
12: Cal State Stanislaus
2: Guilford, St. John's, Greensboro, Oglethorpe, Illinois Wesleyan

Individual
The following men have won more than one individual championship:
3: Chad Collins
2: Mike Bender, Ryan Jenkins

Individual champion's school
The following schools have produced more than one individual champion:
10: Methodist
5: Cal State Stanislaus
2: Oglethorpe, Claremont-Mudd-Scripps, Redlands

See also
NAIA Men's Golf Championship

References

External links
NCAA men's golf

Division III
Golf Men